Mangelia albicincta is a species of sea snail, a marine gastropod mollusk in the family Mangeliidae.

This species was collected by William Stimpson, during the North Pacific Exploring Expedition. The type was destroyed in the Great Chicago fire.

Description
The length of the shell attains 4 mm, its diameter 2 mm.

Distribution
This marine species occurs off the Ryukyus, Japan

References

 Gould, A. A. Descriptions of shells collected in the North Pacific Exploring Expedition1860. under Captains Ringgold and Rodgers. Proc. Boston Soc. Nat. Hist. 1859–1860 vol. 6–8
  R.I. Johnson, The Recent Mollusca of Augustus Addison Gould; United States National Museum, bulletin 239, Washington D.C. 1964

External links
  Tucker, J.K. 2004 Catalog of recent and fossil turrids (Mollusca: Gastropoda). Zootaxa 682: 1–1295.

albicincta
Gastropods described in 1860